Thomas Ruane (died 7 June 1969) was an Irish Fianna Fáil politician. He was a member of Seanad Éireann from 1934 to 1936, 1938 to 1943, 1944 to 1948 and 1951 to 1965. He was first elected to the Free State Seanad in 1934. He did not serve in the 4th or 6th Seanad. From 1938 onwards, he was elected by the Administrative Panel. He lost his seat at the 1965 Seanad election.

References

Year of birth missing
1969 deaths
Fianna Fáil senators
Members of the 1934 Seanad
Members of the 2nd Seanad
Members of the 3rd Seanad
Members of the 5th Seanad
Members of the 7th Seanad
Members of the 8th Seanad
Members of the 9th Seanad
Members of the 10th Seanad